Lisbeth Simper (born 13 January 1978) is a road cyclist from Denmark. She represented her nation at the 1998, 1999, 2000 and 2001 UCI Road World Championships. Between 1999 and 2003 she became 5 times national time trial champion and three times national road race champion of Denmark.

References

External links
 profile at Cyclingarchives.com

1978 births
Danish female cyclists
Living people
Place of birth missing (living people)